The Colorado Department of Natural Resources is the principal department of the Colorado state government responsible for the development, protection, and enhancement Colorado natural resources for the use and enjoyment of the state's present and future residents, as well as for visitors to the state.

The Department of Natural Resources comprises the following 8 divisions:
Colorado Avalanche Information Center
Colorado Division of Forestry
Colorado Division of Reclamation, Mining, and Safety
Colorado Division of Water Resources
Colorado Oil and Gas Conservation Commission
Colorado Parks and Wildlife
Colorado State Land Board
Colorado Water Conservation Board

It formerly included the Colorado Geological Survey which was spun off and subsequently incorporated into the Colorado School of Mines in 2014.

In 2022, the Colorado Department of Natural Resources announced its Colorado Strategic Wildfire Action Program Workforce Development Grant, moving $17.5 million state stimulus dollars to start work on fuels reduction projects and increase Colorado’s capacity to conduct critical forest restoration and wildfire mitigation work.

See also

List of Colorado Natural Areas
List of Colorado state parks
List of Colorado state wildlife areas
List of law enforcement agencies in Colorado
List of State Fish and Wildlife Management Agencies in the U.S.

References

External links

Colorado State Forest Service
 Colorado Division of Reclamation, Mining, and Safety 
Colorado Division of Water Resources
Colorado Oil and Gas Conservation Commission
Colorado Parks and Wildlife
Colorado State Land Board
Colorado Water Conservation Board

State agencies of Colorado
State environmental protection agencies of the United States
Natural resources agencies in the United States